CBX: Canadian Ballroom Extravaganza is a Canadian reality competition web series, which premiered on CBC Arts in March 2022. The series features ten Canadian ballroom artists paired with emerging Canadian filmmakers to create short films highlighting their performances in five ball categories, with audience voting to determine the winner of each challenge until the ultimate winner of the competition is decided. Each of the five categories is also paired with a short introductory video which introduces the competing teams and an overview of the category criteria, as well as informational videos on the overall history and culture of ballroom.

The five categories in the competition are Face, Runway, Bizarre, Vogue and Sex Siren.

The final winner of the competition was announced on May 6, judged by a panel comprising ballroom competitor Miyoko, music video director Sammy Rawal and drag queen Kimora Amour.

Teams
The winner of each category is bolded; the winner of the overall competition is highlighted.

References

External links

2022 Canadian television series debuts
2022 web series debuts
2020s Canadian reality television series
2020s Canadian LGBT-related television series
2020s Black Canadian television series
CBC Television original programming
Ball culture
Canadian non-fiction web series
Canadian LGBT-related web series
Canadian LGBT-related reality television series
Reality competition television series